Clystea dorsilineata is a moth of the subfamily Arctiinae. It was described by George Hampson in 1898. It is found on Jamaica and Cuba.

References

Clystea
Moths described in 1898